The Minister for Foreign Affairs is the foreign minister of Sweden and the head of the Ministry for Foreign Affairs.

The current Minister for Foreign Affairs is Tobias Billström of the Moderate Party.

History
The office was instituted in 1809 as a result of the constitutional Instrument of Government promulgated in the same year. Until 1876 the office was called Prime Minister for Foreign Affairs (commonly known as utrikesstatsminister), similar to the office of Prime Minister for Justice. The Prime Minister for Foreign Affairs initially served as head of the Cabinet of Foreign Mail Exchange at the Royal Office. Following the ministry reform in 1840, the Prime Minister for Foreign Affairs became head of the newly instituted Ministry for Foreign Affairs. In 1876 the office proper of Prime Minister of Sweden was created and at the same time the Prime Minister for Foreign Affairs was nominally demoted to a mere Minister. The holder of the office did however continue to be styled as "Your excellency", until 1974 when the new Instrument of Government came into force. Before the parliamentary breakthrough in the early 20th century, that title had been granted exclusively to members of the most prominent noble families.

Office holders

Prime Ministers for Foreign Affairs (1809–1876)

Ministers for Foreign Affairs (1876–present)
Parties

Status

Statistics

See also
 State Secretary for Foreign Affairs (Sweden)

References

External links
 https://web.archive.org/web/20120506050731/http://www.sweden.gov.se/sb/d/2059

 
Lists of political office-holders in Sweden
Sweden diplomacy-related lists
Lists of foreign ministers